Battle of Langemarck may refer to:
 Battle of Langemarck (1914), part of the First Battle of Ypres
 Battle of Langemarck (1917), part of the Third Battle of Ypres